Aquilegia bertolonii, common name Bertoloni columbine, is a species of flowering plant in the family Ranunculaceae, native to Southern France and Italy. In early summer each erect stem produces up to four spurred, blue-purple flowers.

In cultivation this dwarf columbine is a useful subject for the rockery or alpine garden. It has gained the Royal Horticultural Society's Award of Garden Merit.

References

bertolonii
Plants described in 1853